, the House of Representatives of Japan is elected from a combination of multi-member districts and single-member districts, a method called Parallel voting. Currently, 176 members are elected from 11 multi-member districts (called proportional representation blocks or PR blocks) by a party-list system of proportional representation (PR), and 289 members are elected from single-member districts, for a total of 465. 233 seats are therefore required for a majority. Each PR block consists of one or more prefectures, and each prefecture is divided into one or more single-member districts. In general, the block districts correspond loosely to the major regions of Japan, with some of the larger regions (such as Kantō) subdivided.

History 

Until the 1993 general election, all members of the House of Representatives were elected in multi-member constituencies by single non-transferable vote. In 1994, Parliament passed an electoral reform bill that introduced the current system of parallel voting in single-member constituencies and proportional voting blocks. The original draft bill in 1993 by the anti-LDP coalition of Prime Minister Morihiro Hosokawa included proportional party list voting on a national scale, an equal number of proportional and district seats (250 each) and the possibility of split voting. However, the bill stalled in the House of Councillors. After the Liberal Democratic Party (LDP) had returned to power later that year, it was changed to include proportional voting in regional blocks only, the number of proportional seats was reduced, but the possibility to cast two separate votes was kept in the bill. The electoral reform law was finally passed in 1994. It was first applied in the 1996 general election.

Redistricting and reapportionment 

Amendments to the electoral law in 2002 and 2013 changed the boundaries of single-member districts and reapportioned seats between prefectures (+5/-5 in 2002; +0/-5 in 2013, resulting in a net change of -5 in district seats in the House of Representatives to 295 and overall seats to 475). The borders of the regional proportional blocks have never changed, but the apportionment of seats to the regional proportional blocks changed in 2000 after the number of proportional seats had been reduced from 200 to 180 (reducing the total number of seats in the lower house from 500 to 480), and in the 2002 reapportionment.

Another reapportionment was passed by the National Diet in June 2017. In the majoritarian segment, it will change 97 districts in 19 prefectures, six are eliminated without replacement (one each in Aomori, Iwate, Mie, Nara, Kumamoto and Kagoshima). In the proportional segment, four "blocks" lose a seat each (Tōhoku, N. Kantō, Kinki, Kyūshū). Thus, the number of majoritarian seats is reduced to 289, the number of proportional seats to 176, the House of Representatives overall shrinks to 465. The reform takes effect one month after promulgation, i.e. on July 16, 2017.

Hokkaidō (8 block seats)

The block constituency for Hokkaidō (比例北海道ブロック) elects 8 members proportionally. It contains only Hokkaidō Prefecture, which is divided into 12 single-member districts.

Hokkaidō Prefecture (12 districts)

Tohoku (13 block seats) 
The block constituency for Tohoku (比例東北ブロック) elects 14 members proportionally. It corresponds to the Tohoku region.

Akita Prefecture (3 districts)

Aomori Prefecture (3 districts)

Fukushima Prefecture (4 districts)

Iwate Prefecture (3 districts)

Miyagi Prefecture (5 districts)

Yamagata Prefecture (3 districts)

Kita- (North) Kanto (19 block seats) 
The Northern Kanto proportional representation block (北関東) elects 20 members proportionally. It includes four prefectures in northern Kanto.

Gunma Prefecture (5 districts)

Ibaraki Prefecture (7 districts)

Saitama Prefecture (16 districts)

Tochigi Prefecture (5 districts)

Minami- (Southern) Kanto  (22 block seats) 
The block constituency for southern Kanto (比例南関東ブロック, hirei minami-Kantō burokku) elects 22 members proportionally. It includes two prefectures in southern Kanto and one in eastern Chubu.

Chiba Prefecture (14 districts)

Kanagawa Prefecture (20 districts)

Yamanashi Prefecture (2 districts)

Tokyo  (17 block seats) 
The block constituency for Tokyo (比例東京ブロック) elects 17 members proportionally. It covers Tokyo prefecture.

Tokyo Metropolis (30 districts)

Hokurikushinetsu  (11 block seats) 
The block constituency for Hokurikushinetsu (北陸信越) elects 11 members proportionally. It combines five prefectures of the Hokuriku and Shin'etsu subregions in northern Chubu.

Fukui Prefecture (2 districts)

Ishikawa Prefecture (3 districts)

Niigata Prefecture (5 districts)

Nagano Prefecture (5 districts)

Toyama Prefecture (3 districts)

Tokai  (21 block seats) 
The block constituency for Tokai (東海) elects 21 members proportionally. It covers three prefectures in southern Chubu, as well as one prefecture in Kinki.

Aichi Prefecture (16 districts) 

District 7 - Consists of the cities of Seto, Ōbu, Owariasahi, Toyoake, Nisshin as well as the district of Aichi.
District 8 - Consists of the cities of Handa, Tokoname, Tōkai and Chita, as well as the district of Chita.
District 9 - Consists of the cities of Tsushima, Inazawa, Aisai, Yatomi and Ichinomiya (region of the former city of Bisai), as well as the district of Ama.
District 10 - Consists of the part of Ichinomiya not included in District 9, the cities of Kōnan and Iwakura, as well as the district of Niwa.
District 11 - Consists of the city of Toyota (except for the region of the former town of Inabu), as well as the district of Nishikamo.
District 12 - Consists of the cities of Okazaki and Nishio, as well as the districts of Hazu and Nukata.
District 13 - Consists of the cities of Hekinan, Kariya, Anjō, Chiryū and Takahama.
District 14 - Consists of the cities of Toyokawa, Gamagōri, Shinshiro, Toyota (region of the former town of Inabu), as well as the districts of Kitashitara and Hoi.
District 15 - Consists of the cities of Toyohashi and Tahara.

Gifu Prefecture (5 districts) 

District 1 - Consists of the city of Gifu (except for the region of the former town of Yanaizu).
District 2 - Consists of the cities of Ōgaki and Kaizu, as well as the districts of Yōrō, Fuwa, Anpachi and Ibi.
District 3 - Consists of the cities of Seki, Mino, Hashima, Kakamigahara, Yamagata, Mizuho, Motosu and Gifu (region of the former town of Yanaizu), as well as the districts of Hashima and Motosu.
District 4 - Consists of the cities of Takayama, Minokamo, Kani, Hida, Gujō and Gero, as well as the districts of Kamo, Kani and Ōno.
District 5 - Consists of the cities of Tajimi, Nakatsugawa, Mizunami, Ena and Toki.

Mie Prefecture (4 districts) 

District 1 - Consists of the cities of Tsu and Matsuaka.
District 2 - Consists of the cities of Suzuka, Kameyama, Nabari, Iga, and parts of the city of Yokkaichi.
District 3 - Consists of the cities of Kuwana, Inabe and Yokkaichi (parts not included in District 2), as well as the districts of Kuwana, Inabe and Mie.
District 4 - Consists of the cities of Ise, Owase, Toba, Shima and Kumano, as well as the districts of Taki, Watarai, Kitamuro and Minamimuro.

Shizuoka Prefecture (8 districts) 

District 1 - Consists of the wards of Aoi and Suruga in the city of Shizuoka.
District 2 - Consists of the cities of Shimada, Yaizu, Fujieda, Makinohara and Omaezaki (part not included in District 3), as well as the districts of Shida and Haibara.
District 3 - Consists of the ward of Tenryū (region of the former town of Haruno) in the city of Hamamatsu, the cities of Iwata, Fukuroi, Kakegawa, Kikugawa and Omaezaki (region of the former town of Hamaoka), as well as the district of Shūchi.
District 4 - Consists of the ward of Shimizu in the city of Shizuoka, the city of Fujinomiya, as well as the districts of Fuji and Ihara.
District 5 - Consists of the cities of Mishima, Fuji, Gotenba, Susono and Izunokuni (region of the former town of Izunagaoka), as well as the district of Tagata and the town of Oyama.
District 6 - Consists of the cities of Numazu, Atami, Itō, Shimoda, Izu and Izunokuni (parts not included in District 5), as well as the district of Kamo and the towns of Shimizu and Nagaizumi.
District 7 - Consists of the wards of Naka (region of the former towns of Nishioka and Hanagawa), Nishi, Minami (region of the former towns of Zōra, Takazuka, Higashiwakabayashi and Wakabayashi), Kita, Hamakita and Tenryū (parts not included in District 3) in the city of Hamamatsu, as well as the city of Kosai and the district of Hamana.
District 8 - Consists of the wards of Naka (parts not included in District 7), Higashi and Minami (parts not included in District 7) in the city of Hamamatsu.
(District 9) - Defunct

Kinki/Kansai  (28 block seats) 
The block constituency for Kinki (Kansai) (近畿) elects 29 members proportionally. It corresponds to the Kinki region minus Mie Prefecture.

Hyōgo Prefecture (12 districts) 

District 1 - Consists of the wards of Chūō-ku, Higashinada-ku, and Nada-ku in Kobe.
District 2 - Consists of the wards of Hyōgo-ku, Kita-ku, and Nagata-ku in Kobe.
District 3 - Consists of the wards of Suma-ku and Tarumi-ku in Kobe.
District 4 - Consists of Nishi-ku ward in Kobe, the cities of Kasai, Miki, Nishiwaki, and Ono, and the Katō, Mino and Taka districts.
District 5 - Consists of the cities of Asago, Sanda, Sasayama, Tamba, Toyooka, and Yabu, and the Kawabe and Mikata districts.
District 6 - Consists of the cities of Itami, Kawanishi and Takarazuka.
District 7 - Consists of the cities of Ashiya and Nishinomiya.
District 8 - Consists of the city of Amagasaki.
District 9 - Consists of the cities of Akashi, Awaji, Minamiawaji, and Sumoto, as well as the Tsuna district.
District 10 - Consists of the cities of Kakogawa and Takasago, as well as the Kako district.
District 11 - Consists of the city of Himeji.
District 12 - Consists of the cities of Aioi, Ako, Shiso, and Tatsuno, as well as the Akō, Ibo, Kanzaki, Sayō, Shikama and Shisō districts.

Kyoto Prefecture (6 districts) 

District 1 - Consists of the wards of Kamigyō-ku, Kita-ku, Nakagyō-ku, Minami-ku, and Shimogyō-ku in Kyoto.
District 2 - Consists of the wards of Higashiyama-ku, Sakyō-ku, and Yamashina-ku in Kyoto.
District 3 - Consists of the ward of Fushimi-ku in Kyoto, the cities of Mukō and Nagaokakyō, and the Otokuni district.
District 4 - Consists of the wards of Nishikyō-ku and Ukyō-ku in Kyoto, the city of Kameoka, and the Funai and Kitakuwada districts.
District 5 - Consists of the cities of Ayabe, Fukuchiyama, Kyōtango, Maizuru, and Miyazu, as well as the Amata, Kasa, and Yosa districts.
District 6 - Consists of the cities of Joyo, Kyōtanabe, Uji, and Yawata, as well as the Kuse, Sōraku, and Tsuzuki districts.

Nara Prefecture (3 districts) 

District 1 - Consists of the cities of Ikoma and Nara (except for the recently annexed Tsuge village).
District 2 - Consists of the cities of Ikoma, Kashiba, Tenri, and Yamatokōriyama, as well as the districts of Yamabe, Ikoma, Kitakatsuragi and Shiki. Also includes the part of Nara city that was formerly Tsuge village in the Yamabe district.
District 3 - Consists of the cities of Gojō, Kashihara, and Sakurai, Gose, Katsuragi, and Yamatotakada, as well as the districts of Takaichi, Uda, and Yoshino.

Osaka Prefecture (19 districts) 

District 1 - Consists of the wards of Chūō-ku, Ikuno-ku, Minato-ku, Naniwa-ku, Nishi-ku, and Tennōji-ku in Osaka city.
District 2 - Consists of the wards of Abeno-ku, Higashisumiyoshi-ku, and Hirano-ku in Osaka city.
District 3 - Consists of the wards of Nishinari-ku, Suminoe-ku, Sumiyosho-ku, and Taisho-ku in Osaka city.
District 4 - Consists of the wards of Fukushima-ku, Higashinari-ku, Joto-ku, Kita-ku, and Miyakojima-ku in Osaka city.
District 5 - Consists of the wards of Higashiyodogawa-ku, Konohana-ku, Nishiyodogawa-ku, and Yodogawa-ku in Osaka city.
District 6 - Consists of the wards of Asahi-ku and Tsurumi-ku in Osaka city, as well as the cities of Kadoma and Moriguchi.
District 7 - Consists of the cities of Settsu and Suita.
District 8 - Consists of the city of Toyonaka.
District 9 - Consists of the cities of Ibaraki, Ikeda, and Minoo, as well as the Toyono district.
District 10 - Consists of the city of Takatsuki as well as the Mishima district.
District 11 - Consists of the cities of Hirakata and Katano.
District 12 - Consists of the cities of Daitō, Neyagawa, and Shijōnawate.
District 13 - Consists of the city of Higashiōsaka.
District 14 - Consists of the cities of Fujiidera, Habikino, Kashiwara, and Yao.
District 15 - Consists of the cities of Kawachinagano, Matsubara, Ōsakasayama, and Tondabayashi, as well as the Minamikawachi district. Also contains the Mihara sector of Sakai city.

District 16 - Consists of the Higashi, Kita, and Sakai sectors of Sakai city.
District 17 - Consists of the areas of Sakai city not in districts 15 or 16.
District 18 - Consists of the cities of Izumi, Izumiōtsu, Kishiwada, and Takaishi, as well as the Senboku district.
District 19 - Consists of the cities of Hannan, Izumisano, Kaizuka, and Sennan, as well as the Sennan district.

Shiga Prefecture (3 districts) 

District 1 - Consists of the cities of Ōtsu and Takashima as well as the Shiga district.
District 2 - Consists of the cities of Hikone, Maibara and Nagahama as well as the Echi, Higashiazai, Ika, Inukami, and Sakata districts. Also includes the part of Higashiōmi that formerly comprised Aitō and Kotō in the Echi district.
District 3 - Consists of the cities of Kusatsu, Moriyama, Rittō and Yasu.
District 4 - Consists of the cities of Higashiōmi (except the parts listed in district 2), Kōka, Konan and Ōmihachiman as well as the Gamō and Kanzaki districts.

Wakayama Prefecture (2 districts) 

District 1 - Consists of Wakayama city.
District 2 - Consists of Hashimoto and Kainan cities, as well as the Ito, Kaisō, and Naga districts.
District 3 - Consists of Arida, Gobō, Shingū, and Tanabe cities, as well as the Arida, Hidaka, Higashimuro, and Nishimuro districts.

Chugoku  (11 block seats) 
The block constituency for Chugoku (中国) elects 11 members proportionally. It corresponds to the Chugoku region.

Hiroshima Prefecture (6 districts) 

District 1 - Consists of the Higashi-ku, Minami-ku, and Naka-ku wards in Hiroshima city.
District 2 - Consists of the Nishi-ku and Saeki-ku wards in Hiroshima city, the cities of Etajima (except the original town of Etajima), Hatsukaichi, and Ōtake, and the Saeki district.
District 3 - Consists of the Asakita-ku and Asaminami-ku wards in Hiroshima city, the city of Akitakata, and the Yamagata district.
District 4 - Consists of the Aki-ku ward in Hiroshima city and the Aki district. Also, it includes parts of the cities of Kure (the former towns of Kamagari, Kurahashi, Ondo, and Shimokamagari), Higashihiroshima (all except for the former Akitsu town), Mihara (the former Daiwa town), and Etajima (the original Etajima town).
District 5 - Consists of Takehara city and the Toyota district. Also includes Kure (except as in District 4), the part of Higashihiroshima comprising the former Akitsu town, and the part of Mihara comprising the former Hongō town.
District 6 - Consists of the cities of Fuchū, Innoshima, Miyoshi, Onomichi, and Shōbara, as well as the Jinseki and Sera districts. Also includes the part of Mihara comprising the former Kui town.
District 7 - Consists of the city of Fukuyama and the Fukayasu district.

Okayama Prefecture (4 districts) 

District 1 - Consists of parts of the city of Okayama, as well as the town of Kibichūō (region of the former town of Kamogawa).
District 2 - Consists of the cities of Okayama (parts not included in Districts 1 and 3), Tamano and Setouchi.
District 3 - Consists of the cities of Tsuyama, Bizen, Akaiwa, Maniwa (part not included in District 5), Mimasaka and Okayama (region of the former town of Seto), as well as the districts of Wake, Maniwa, Tomata, Katsuta, Aida and Kume.
District 4 - Consists of the city of Kurashiki (parts not included in District 5) and the district of Tsukubo.
District 5 - Consists of the cities of Kasaoka, Ibara, Sōja, Takahashi, Niimi, Maniwa (region of the former town of Hokubō), Kurashiki (region of the former towns of Funao and Mabi) and Asakuchi, as well as the districts of Asakuchi, Oda and the town of Kibichūō (part not included in District 1).

Shimane Prefecture (2 districts) 

District 1 - Consists of the cities of Matsue and Yasugi, the Nita, Oki and Yatsuka districts, the part of Unnan city formerly comprising Ohara, and the part of Izumo city formerly comprising Hirata.
District 2 - Consists of the cities of Gōtsu, Hamada, Izumo (excluding former Hirata), Masuda, and Ōda, the Hikawa, Iishi, Kanoashi, Mino, Naka, Nima, and Ōchi districts, and the part of Unnan city formerly comprising Kakeya town, Mitoya town, and Yoshida village in the Iishi district.

Tottori Prefecture (2 districts) 

District 1 - Consists of the cities of Kurayoshi and Tottori, the Iwami, Ketaka, and Yazu districts, and the towns of Misasa and Yurihama in the Tōhaku district.
District 2 - Consists of the cities of Sakaiminato and Yonago, the Hino and Saihaku districts, and the towns of Daiei, Hōjō, and Kotoura in the Tōhaku district.

Yamaguchi Prefecture (3 districts) 

District 1 - Consists of the cities of Hōfu and Yamaguchi city (except for the annexed Atō town), as well as the part of Shūnan city formerly comprising Tokuyama, Shinnanyo, and Kano town.
District 2 - Consists of the cities of Hikari, Iwakuni, Kudamatsu, and Yanai and the districts of Kuga, Kumage, and Ōshima, as well as the part of Shūnan city formerly comprising Kumage town.
District 3 - Consists of the cities of Hagi, Mine, Sanyo-Onoda, and Ube and the Abu districts, as well as the part of Yamaguchi city formerly comprising Atō town.
District 4 - Consists of the cities of Nagato and Shimonoseki.

Shikoku  (6 block seats) 
The block constituency for Shikoku (比例四国ブロック) elects 6 members proportionally. It corresponds to the Shikoku region.

Ehime Prefecture (3 districts) 

District 1 - Consists of the city of Matsuyama, except for the recently annexed regions comprising the former Hōjō city and Nakajima town.
District 2 - Consists of the cities of Imabari, Iyo, and Tōon, and the districts of Iyo, Kamiukena, Ochi. Also includes the parts of Matsuyama comprising the former Hōjō city and Nakajima town, and the part of Uchiko comprising the former Oda town.
District 3 - Consists of the cities of Niihama, Saijō, and Shikokuchūō.
District 4 - Consists of the cities of Ōzu, Seiyo, Uwajima, and Yawatahama, as well as the districts of Kita (except for part of Uchiko in District 2), Kitauwa, Minamiuwa, and Nishiuwa.

Kagawa Prefecture (3 districts) 

District 1 - Consists of Takamatsu city, the Shozu district, and Naoshima town in the Kagawa district.
District 2 - Consists of the cities of Higashikagawa, Sakaide, and Sanuki, as well as the Ayauta, Kagawa (except Naoshima), and Kita districts.
District 3 - Consists of the cities of Kan'onji, Marugame, and Zentsuji, as well as the Mitoyo and Nakatado districts.

Kōchi Prefecture (2 districts)

Tokushima Prefecture (2 districts)

Kyūshū  (20 block seats) 
The block constituency for Kyūshū (九州) elects 21 members proportionally. It includes all the prefectures on Kyūshū island, as well as Okinawa Prefecture.

Fukuoka Prefecture (11 districts) 

District 1 - Consists of the wards of Hakata-ku and Higashi-ku in Fukuoka.
District 2 - Consists of the wards of Chūō-ku, Jonan-ku, and Minami-ku in Fukuoka.
District 3 - Consists of the wards of Nishi-ku and Sawara-ku in Fukuoka, the city of Maebaru, and the Itoshima district.
District 4 - Consists of the cities of Fukutsu, Koga, and Munakata, as well as the Kasuya district.
District 5 - Consists of the cities of Amagi, Chikushino, Dazaifu, Kasuga, and Onojo, as well as the Asakura and Chikushi districts.
District 6 - Consists of the cities of Kurume, Ogori, Okawa, and Ukiha, as well as the Mii and Mizuma districts.
District 7 - Consists of the cities of Chikugo, Omuta, Yame, and Yanagawa, as well as the Miike, Yamato, and Yame districts.
District 8 - Consists of the cities of Iizuka, Nakama, Nogata, and Yamada, as well as the Kaho, Kurate, and Onga districts.
District 9 - Consists of the wards of Tobata-ku, Wakamatsu-ku, Yahatahigashi-ku, and Yahatanishi-ku in Kitakyushu.
District 10 - Consists of the wards of Kokurakita-ku, Kokuraminami-ku, and Moji-ku in Kitakyushu.
District 11 - Consists of the cities of Buzen, Tagawa, and Yukuhashi, as well as the Chikujō, Miyako, and Tagawa districts.

Kagoshima Prefecture (4 districts) 

District 1 - Consists of the portions of Kagoshima city (the portions that are administered from: the main office and the Higashisakurajima, Ishiki, Yoshino, Sakurajima and Yoshida branch offices). Includes the former cities of Matsumoto and Koriyama that are now part of the city of Kagoshima. Additionally includes the Kagoshima district.
District 2 - Consists of the remainder of Kagoshima city, the cities of Ibusuki, Makurazaki, Amami, Naze, Minamisatsuma, Minamikyushu, and the district of Ōshima.
District 3 - Consists of the cities of Izumi, Akune, Hioki, Kaseda, Kushikino, Ichikikushikino, Isa, Aira and Satsumasendai, as well as the Aira, Hioki, Kawanabe, Satsuma, and Izumi districts.
District 4 - Consists of the cities of Nishinoomote, Kanoya, Kokubu, Tarumizu, Soo, Shibushi, and Okuchi, as well as the Isa, Kimotsuki, Kumage, and Soo districts.

Kumamoto Prefecture (4 districts) 

District 1 - Consists of part of the city of Kumamoto (the wards of Chuo, Higashi, and Kita)
District 2 - Consists of the parts of Kumamoto city not in District 1 (the wards of Nishi and Minami), the cities Arao and Tamana, and the Tamana district.
District 3 - Consists of the cities of Kochi, Aso, Kikuchi, and Yamaga, as well as the Aso, Kamimashiki, and Kikuchi districts. 
District 4 - Consists of the cities of Yatsushiro, Hitoyoshi, Minamata, Hondo, Kami-Amakusa, Uki, Ushibuka, and Uto, as well as the Ashikita, Kuma, Yatsushiro, Amakusa, Kamimashiki, and Shimomashiki districts.

Miyazaki Prefecture (3 districts) 

District 1 - Consists of the city of Miyazaki, as well as the Higashimorokata and Miyazaki districts.
District 2 - Consists of the cities of Hyuga, Nobeoka, and Saito, as well as the Higashiusuki, Koyu, and Nishiusuki districts.
District 3 - Consists of the cities of Ebino, Kobayashi, Kushima, Miyakonojo, and Nichinan, as well as the Kitamorokata, Minaminaka, and Nishimorokata districts.

Nagasaki Prefecture (3 districts) 

District 1 - Consists of Nagasaki, except for the former Sotome town.
District 2 - Consists of the cities of Isahaya, Saikai, and Shimabara, as well as the Nishisonogi and Minamitakaki districts, and the former Sotome town.
District 3 - Consists of the cities of Gotō, Iki, Omura, and Tsushima, as well as the Higashisonogi and Minamimatsura districts.
District 4 - Consists of the cities of Hirado, Matsuura, and Sasebo, as well as the Kitamatsuura district.

Ōita Prefecture (3 districts)

Okinawa Prefecture (4 districts)

Saga Prefecture (2 districts)

See also
List of districts of the House of Councillors of Japan
House of Representatives (Japan)
Proportional Representation

Notes

References

External links 
 MIC, e-Gov legal database: 公職選挙法 (kōshoku senkyo hō), Law No. 100 of April 25, 1950 (the three appended tables list the area/number of seats for all electoral districts to both Houses of the National Diet); MOJ, Japanese Law Translation Database: Public Offices Election Act ([by definition unofficial] translation to English, if available)

 
General elections in Japan
Japan
Districts of the House of Representatives of Japan